Cumber Upper is a civil parish in County Londonderry, Northern Ireland. It is mainly situated in the historic barony of Tirkeeran, with one townland (Stranagalwilly) in the barony of Strabane Lower.

Towns and villages
The civil parish contains the village of Craigbane.

Townlands
The civil parish contains the following townlands:

Alla Lower
Alla Upper
Altaghoney
Ballyartan
Ballycallaghan
Ballyholly
Ballymaclanigan
Ballyrory
Barr Cregg
Binn
Carnanbane
Carnanreagh
Claudy
Coolnacolpagh
Cregg
Cregg Barr
Cumber
Dunady
Dungorkin
Gilky Hill
Glenlough
Gortilea
Gortnaran
Gortnaskey
Gortscreagan
Kilcaltan
Kilculmagrandal
Kilgort
Killycor
Kinculbrack
Lear
Letterlogher
Lettermuck
Ling
Lisbunny
Mulderg
Raspberry Hill
Sallowilly
Stranagalwilly
Tireighter
Tullintrain

See also
List of civil parishes of County Londonderry

References